Marko Vranjković (born January 9, 1990 in Maribor, SFR Yugoslavia) is a Slovenian professional basketball player. He is a 2.04 m (6 ft 8 in) tall forward.

External links
playbasket.it

1990 births
Living people
Forwards (basketball)
Sportspeople from Maribor
Slovenian men's basketball players